Vladimir Semenovich Myshkin (born June 19, 1955) is a Russian former ice hockey goaltender.  He was a goaltender for HC Dynamo Moscow and the Soviet Union national ice hockey team in the 1970s and 1980s.

Life and career
Myshkin was born in Kirovo-Chepetsk, Soviet Union. During his career in the Soviet Championship League, Myshkin was consistently among the top goaltenders in the league and his Dynamo Moscow club was always among the best. However, rival Moscow club HC CSKA Moscow won the championship almost every year he played, including an amazing 13-year run from 1977 to 1989, preventing Myshkin from winning a domestic championship until his last year.

Myshkin came to prominence in the late 1970s when he earned a spot on the Soviet national team as a backup to the legendary Vladislav Tretiak. On February 11, 1979, he was the surprise choice of coach Viktor Tikhonov to start in the deciding game in the Challenge Cup tournament against the National Hockey League all stars.  Myshkin responded with a sterling effort, shutting out the NHL stars 6-0 to win the Challenge Cup for the Soviets. A couple of months later, he won his first of six World and European championships, the others coming in 1981, 1982, 1983, 1986, and 1990.

After Tretiak gave up two goals in the first period of  the famous "Miracle on Ice" game versus the USA in the medal round of the 1980 Winter Olympics, Tikhonov replaced him with Myshkin.  He faced only 2 shots in the second period, and stopped them both, but gave up 2 goals in the third scored by Americans Mark Johnson and Mike Eruzione.  Team USA won the game 4-3 and went on to capture the gold medal with the Soviets taking the silver.

In 1981, Myshkin was a member of the Soviet team that won the Canada Cup, the only time Canada failed to win the tournament. He played in one game and backed up Tretiak for the 8-1 victory in the final.

In 1984, he won his only Olympic gold medal, backing up Tretiak for the last time. Tretiak retired after the tournament.

In his first major event as starting goaltender of the Soviet national team, he led the Soviets to a perfect 5-0 record in the round robin of the 1984 Canada Cup by going 3-0 in his three starts before being defeated by Canada 3-2 in overtime in the semifinals. Nonetheless, Myshkin played spectacularly that game in a losing cause, being named the USSR's player of the game, and was named to the tournament all-star team for his heroics.

As the starting goaltender of the national team, he backstopped them to a bronze medal at the 1985 World Championships and a gold in 1986 on home ice in Moscow. The following year, the 31-year-old Myshkin was replaced by younger goaltenders Evgeny Belosheikin and Sergei Mylnikov. After 1986, he appeared only once more at the World Championships, that being in 1990 as the team's third-string goaltender in a largely token gesture, as Myshkin had already announced he would retire following the season.

Myshkin's final season would be a memorable one. First, he won the Soviet League championship for the only time in his career, as his Dynamo club ended CSKA's long championship reign and won its first title since 1954. Then at the World Championships, after watching his team's first nine games, he was given the start in the very last game. He finished his career in style, shutting out Czechoslovakia 5-0 and clinched the gold medal.

References

External links
Statistics
 

1955 births
Living people
People from Kirovo-Chepetsk
HC Dynamo Moscow players
Ice hockey players at the 1980 Winter Olympics
Ice hockey players at the 1984 Winter Olympics
Krylya Sovetov Moscow players
Lukko players
Medalists at the 1984 Winter Olympics
Olympic gold medalists for the Soviet Union
Olympic ice hockey players of the Soviet Union
Olympic medalists in ice hockey
Olympic silver medalists for the Soviet Union
Russia men's national ice hockey team coaches
Russian ice hockey coaches
Russian ice hockey goaltenders
Soviet expatriate ice hockey players
Soviet ice hockey goaltenders
Medalists at the 1980 Winter Olympics
Soviet expatriate sportspeople in Finland
Sportspeople from Kirov Oblast